"Graceland" is the title song of the album Graceland, released in 1986 by Paul Simon. The song features vocals by The Everly Brothers.

The lyrics deal with the singer's thoughts during a road trip to Graceland after the failure of his marriage. Actress and author Carrie Fisher, Simon's ex-wife, said that the song referred in part to their relationship.

In addition to his trip to Graceland, the Memphis home of Elvis Presley, the song contains allusions to other cultural touchstones, such as National Guitars.

Reception
Billboard said that "Remarkable supporting players from his South Africa sessions make Simon's multiple-meaning musings into something subtly exotic."

The song won the 1988 Grammy Award for Record of the Year.  It was the lowest-charting song on any of the world music charts to win Record of the Year until the Robert Plant and Alison Krauss US non-charting song "Please Read the Letter" won the same award in 2009.

It was listed at #485 on Rolling Stone's 500 Greatest Songs in 2004.

"Graceland" has been covered by artists such as Hot Chip, Grizzly Bear, El Vez, Casiotone for the Painfully Alone, The Tallest Man on Earth, Justin Townes Earle and Joshua Lee Turner.

A cover by Willie Nelson peaked at number 70 on the Billboard Hot Country Singles & Tracks chart in 1993. In Nelson's version, he alters the line "There is a girl in New York City, who calls herself the human trampoline," replacing New York City with Austin, Texas. Simon and Nelson have performed the song together on several occasions, including Farm Aid V, in Irving, Texas, on March 14, 1992, Willie's 60th birthday concert in April 1993, and when both men appeared as musical guests on the eighteenth season finale of Saturday Night Live on May 15, 1993.

An acoustic version of the song was included as a track on The Unplugged Collection, Volume One.

Personnel
Paul Simon – lead vocals, background vocals, acoustic guitar (uncredited)
Ray Phiri – guitar
Demola Adepoju – pedal steel
Bakithi Kumalo – fretless bass
Vusi Khumalo – drums
Makhaya Mahlangu – percussion
The Everly Brothers – guitars, additional vocals

Charts

Certifications

Trivia
The "Human Trampoline", which Simon apparently invented, is referenced in Salman Rushdie's book Quichotte.

References

Paul Simon songs
1986 songs
Grammy Award for Record of the Year
Songs written by Paul Simon
Song recordings produced by Paul Simon
Willie Nelson songs
Songs about Memphis, Tennessee
1986 singles
Warner Records singles